Percy Main Amateurs Football Club is a football club based in Percy Main in Tyne and Wear, England.

History
The club was established in 1919 by demobilised soldiers returning after fighting in World War I. They joined the Northern Amateur League, going on to win the league title  in their first season. They were also winners of the Northumberland Minor Cup, beating Byker St. Lawrence 2–1 in the final at Croft Park in Blyth in front of a crowd of around 5,000. A special train had been put on to bring fans up from Percy Main. Although tradition has the club's colours as claret and blue, at that time they were blue and white. The Northern Amateur League was won again the following season, with the club also winning the Tynemouth War Memorial Shield, defeating Whitley Athletic 2–1 after extra time at Hawkey's Lane before a crowd of almost 6,000. Following these initial successes, the club made an application to join the Northern Alliance, but were rejected. The club were subsequently runners-up in the league, the league cup and the Tynemouth Dispensary Cup in 1921–22. The following season saw them win the Tynemouth Dispensary Cup Final with a 1–0 win over New York United.

Percy Main were then accepted into the Northern Alliance. However, they returned to the Northern Amateur League the following year due to the cost of travelling. They then won the Amateur League twice in the next four years, before moving to the Tyneside League in 1929. In October 1929, the club won the Amateur Shield at the North East Coast Exhibition in Newcastle upon Tyne, beating Stockton 3–1 in the final at St. James' Park They also reached the quarter-finals of the FA Amateur Cup in 1929–30, and were runners-up in the Tyneside League in 1932–33. In 1936–37 the club finished bottom of the league, which they left at the end of the following season, returning to the Northern Amateur League.

In 1968 Percy Main rejoined the Northern Alliance, and in 1971–72 they won the League Cup. They were champions in 1980–81 and retained the title the following season. Although the club were runners-up the following season, they went into gradual decline, and were relegated from the Premier Division to Division One at the end of the 1990–91 season. In 1998–99 they were Division One champions, earning promotion back to the Premier Division. The club won the League Cup for a second time the following season, but were relegated to Division One again at the end of the 2005–06 season after finishing bottom of the Premier Division. They were Division One runners-up in 2009–10, resulting in another promotion to the Premier Division. Although the club were relegated again in 2013–14, they won Division One at the first attempt to earn an immediate promotion back to the Premier Division.

Ground
The club's ground was originally named Middle Row Park. In September 1925 a new dressing pavilion was opened. Although this was badly damaged by fire in early 1927, the club rebuilt it in time for the start of the 1927–28 season. In 1996 the ground was renamed Purvis Park after Alan Purvis, a former player, secretary and chairman who spent over 50 years at the club.

Club officials
 Owner: Ryan Lynch, Paul Springett
 Chairman: Paul Springett
 Secretary: Norman de Bruin
 Treasurer: Bob Rodgerson
 Manager: Gavin Hattrick
 Assistant Manager: Richard Stretton
 Coach: Carl Chater
 Coach: Sean Allen 
 Committee: George Mooney, Steve Hurd, Alan Armstrong, Jack Bowden, Arthur Iles, Julie Hurd, Terry Overton, Keith Bell.
 Club Captain: tba

Honours
Northern Alliance
Champions 1980–81, 1981–82
Division One champions 1998–99, 2014–15
League Cup winners 1971–72, 1999–2000
Combination Cup winners 2009-10
Northern Amateur League
Champions 1919–20, 1920–21, 1925–26, 1927–28, 1947-48, 1963-64, 1964-65 (tied)
League Challenge Cup winners 1925–26, 1967–68
Northumberland Amateur Cup
Winners 1967-68, 1969–70, 1970–71
Northumberland Minor Cup
Winners 1919–20
Tynemouth War Memorial Shield
Winners 1920–21
Tynemouth Dispensary Cup
Winners 1922–23, 1930–31, 1931-32
Willington Quay Nursing Association Cup
Winners 1929–30
South-East Northumberland Hospitals Cup
Winners 1963–64 (joint), 1966–67, 1974–75
North Tyneside Hospitals Cup
Winners 1977–78, 1979–80, 1981–82, 1982-83
Northumberland Senior Benevolent Bowl
Winners 1977–78, 2003–04, 2010–11
North East Coast Exhibition Amateur Football Shield
Winners 1929–30

Records
Best FA Cup performance: Preliminary round, 1982–83
Best FA Amateur Cup performance: Quarter-finals, 1929–30
Best FA Vase performance: Fifth round, 1982–83

Results
Record Win – 18-0 (v. North Shields YMCA 1967 - Northumberland F.A. Minor Cup)
Record Defeat – 0-14 (v. Wallington F.C. 2022 - Northern Alliance)

See also
Percy Main Amateurs F.C. players

References

External links
Official website

Football clubs in England
Football clubs in Tyne and Wear
Association football clubs established in 1919
1919 establishments in England
Northern Football Alliance